Pylyp Orlyk’s Constitution ( (Konstytutsiia Pylypa Orlyka), formally titled as The Treaties and Resolutions of the Rights and Freedoms of the Zaporozhian Army ( (Dohovory i Postanovlennia Prav i volʹnostei Viisʹka Zaporozʹkoho) 
is a constitutional document written by the Hetman of Ukraine, Pylyp Orlyk, the Cossack elders and the Cossacks of the Zaporozhian Army on the 5 April 1710 in the city of Bender (Tighina) in the Principality of Moldavia. 

It established the principle of the separation of powers in government between the legislative, executive, and judiciary branches well before the publication of Montesquieu's Spirit of the Laws.  The document limited the executive authority of the hetman, and established a Cossack parliament called the (General Rada).

The Latin-language  original  is kept in the National Archives of Sweden.

History 

After the Battle of Poltava, when Charles XII of Sweden's and Hetman Ivan Mazepa's armies were defeated by Peter I of Russia, Pylyp Orlyk remained with Mazepa. Together, Orlyk, Mazepa, and their Cossack forces retreated to the city of Bendery, in Bessarabia (now Moldova, then part of the Ottoman Empire). The Zaporizhian Cossack Army also settled in this area.

After Mazepa died, on 5 April 1710 Pylyp Orlyk was elected as the Hetman of the Zaporizhian Host. On the same day, he issued the Pacts and Constitutions of Rights and Freedoms of the Zaporizhian Host. Orlyk's Constitution is sometimes referred to by the city of its proclamation, the Bendery Constitution.

Articles of the Constitution 
The Ukrainian-language title  reads: "Договори і постанови прав і свобод військових між Ясновельможним Його Милості паном Пилипом Орликом, новообраним гетьманом Війська Запорізького, і між генеральними особами, полковниками і тим же Військом Запорізьким з повною згодою з обох сторін"
The document is made up of a preamble 
and 16 articles.

Preamble
The preamble briefly discusses Cossack history, their Khazar origin myth, the rise of the Zaporizhian Sich and its downfall when after under Bohdan Khmelnytsky it rebelled against the Polish-Lithuanian Commonwealth and ended up serving Imperial Russia. According to the introduction, using all available means, Moscow limited and nullified rights and freedoms of the Zaporizhian Host and eventually subjugated the free Cossack nation. Ivan Mazepa's politics and alliance with Charles XII of Sweden are explained as logical and inevitable, mandated by the need to free the homeland.  The independence of the new state from Russia is given as the primary goal of the Bendery Constitution.

Articles 1 - 5
Articles 1-3 dealt with general Ukrainian affairs. They proclaimed the Eastern Orthodox faith to be the faith of Ukraine, and to further the independence from Moscow, the Kyiv Patriarchate must acquire the direct subordination to the Apostolic Capital of Constantinople. The residence of people professing other faiths, especially Judaism, must be forbidden.  The Sluch River was designated as the boundary between Ukraine and Poland.  The articles also recognized the need for an anti-Russian alliance between Ukraine and the Crimean Khanate.

Articles 4-5 reflected the interests of the Zaporozhian Cossacks, who constituted the overwhelming majority of the Bendery emigration. The Hetman was obligated: 
 to expel, with the help of Charles XII, the Russians from Zaporozhian territories
 to grant the town of Trakhtemyriv to the Zaporozhians to serve as a hospital, and
 to disallow non-Zaporozhians to own anything in Zaporozhian territories

Articles 6 - 16
Articles 6-10 limited the powers of the hetman and established a Cossack parliament, similar to an extended council of officers, which was to meet three times a year. The General Council was to consist not only of the general staff and the regimental colonels, but also of "an outstanding and worthy individual from each regiment." 

Articles 11-16 protected the rights of towns, limited the taxation of peasants and poor Cossacks, and restricted the innkeepers.  Charles XII, king of Sweden and "the protector of Ukraine," happened to be in Bendery at the time, and confirmed these articles.

Memory 

On 9 April 2010, the 300th anniversary of the creation of the Constitution, a monument was dedicated in Bender. The monument is in the form of a book with engraved information about the history of the writing of the Constitution and its full name in Ukrainian and Latin.

See also 
 Skirmish at Bender

References

Further reading 
 Dogovor i postanovlenie mezhdu Get'manom Orlikom i voiskom Zaporozhskim v 1710, in Chteniia v Imperatorskom obshchestve istorii i drevnostei rossiiskikh (Moscow 1858)
 Krupnyts’kyi, B. Het'man Pylyp Orlyk i ioho politychna diial’nist’ (1672–1742) (Warsaw 1938)
 Vasylenko, M. The Constitution of Pylyp Orlyk, AUA, 6, nos 3-4 (1958)
 Sliusarenko, A. H.; Tomenko, M. V.  Istoriia Ukrainskoi Konstytytsii, "Znannia," (Ukraine 1993),

External links 
 Encyclopedia of Ukraine
  Text of the Pylyp Orlik Constitution
  Information about the Constitution
  Transcript of Pylyp Orlyk's autograph Contenta Pactorum - Brief Latin version

Political history of Ukraine
Defunct constitutions
Constitutions of Ukraine
Legal history of Ukraine
Government of the Cossack Hetmanate
1710s in Ukraine
18th century in the Zaporozhian Host